María Eugenia Rojas may refer to:

 María Eugenia Rojas Correa (born 1932), Colombian political figure
 María Eugenia Rojas (tennis) (born 1977), Peruvian tennis player